Rauhan Puolesta (Finnish: Pro Peace) is a cultural and news magazine published in Helsinki, Finland. It has been circulated since 1957.

History and profile
Rauhan Puolesta was established in 1957. It is published by the Finnish Peace Committee. The magazine, based in Helsinki, appears six times a year and disseminates the news about the committee. The magazine has both in print and online versions. The newsletter of the Africa Committee in Finland is also published in the magazine.

See also
 List of magazines in Finland

References

External links

1957 establishments in Finland
Bi-monthly magazines published in Finland
Cultural magazines
Finnish-language magazines
Magazines established in 1957
Magazines published in Helsinki
News magazines published in Europe
Online magazines
Political magazines published in Finland